Fulton is a city in Whiteside County, Illinois, United States. The population was 3,481 at the 2010 census, down from 3,881 in 2000. Fulton is located across the Mississippi River from Clinton, Iowa.

History
A post office called Fulton has been in operation since 1838. The city was named for Robert Fulton, inventor of the steamboat.

Geography
Fulton is located at  (41.866873, -90.158834), on the east bank of the Mississippi River near Lock and Dam #13. The most northeastly portion of the county is in the Driftless Area of Illinois, where the Apple River meets the Upper Mississippi River.

Fulton is a city most known for its pride in its Dutch heritage. This is shown through the addition of a traditional Dutch windmill, De Immigrant, located near the city's dike, which borders the Mississippi. Other local attractions include: the Martin House Museum, Heritage Canyon, the Dutch Days festival held annually on the first weekend of May, and its view of the Mississippi River.

Climate

Demographics

As of the census of 2000, there were 3,881 people, 1,582 households, and 1,071 families residing in the city. The racial makeup of the city was 97.91% White, 0.59% African American, 0.18% Native American, 0.52% Asian, 0.33% from other races, and 0.46% from two or more races. Hispanic or Latino of any race were 1.26% of the population.

There were 1,582 households, out of which 30.6% had children under the age of 18 living with them, 56.3% were married couples living together, 8.3% had a female householder with no husband present, and 32.3% were non-families. 28.8% of all households were made up of individuals, and 12.6% had someone living alone who was 65 years of age or older. The average household size was 2.37 and the average family size was 2.89.

In the city, the population was spread out, with 23.7% under the age of 18, 7.0% from 18 to 24, 26.7% from 25 to 44, 22.5% from 45 to 64, and 20.1% who were 65 years of age or older. The median age was 40 years. For every 100 females, there were 97.7 males. For every 100 females age 18 and over, there were 94.9 males.

The median income for a household in the city was $37,068, and the median income for a family was $45,134. Males had a median income of $32,359 versus $20,653 for females. The per capita income for the city was $19,845. About 3.5% of families and 5.8% of the population were below the poverty line, including 7.8% of those under age 18 and 3.2% of those age 65 or over.

Notable people
 John R. Huizenga, professor of chemistry and physics who contributed to the Manhattan Project and the discovery of the elements Einsteinium and Fermium
 Jack Reagan, father of President Ronald Reagan
 Nelle Wilson Reagan, mother of Ronald Reagan
 Paul Rhymer, creator and writer of the radio series Vic and Sade (Born in Fulton, raised in Bloomington, Illinois)

Gallery

References

External links
City Web site
Fulton's Dutch Windmill "De Immigrant" history and photos.

Cities in Illinois
Illinois populated places on the Mississippi River
Cities in Whiteside County, Illinois
Driftless Area